Gartan Lough, also known as Lough Beagh South, is a freshwater lake in the northwest of Ireland. It is located in north County Donegal close to the eastern boundary of Glenveagh National Park.

Geography

Hydrology
Gartan Lough is fed by the Bullaba River entering at its southern end. The lake drains northeastwards into the River Leannan, which in turn enters Lough Fern.

Natural history
Fish species in Gartan Lough include Arctic char. Gartan Lough is part of the Leannan River Special Area of Conservation.

See also
List of loughs in Ireland

References

Gartan